Alfredo Anaya Gudiño (born 8 November 1950) is a Mexican politician affiliated with the PRI. He served as Deputy of the LXII Legislature of the Mexican Congress representing Michoacán. He also served as Deputy during the LV Legislature

References

1950 births
Living people
Politicians from Michoacán
Institutional Revolutionary Party politicians
21st-century Mexican politicians
Universidad Michoacana de San Nicolás de Hidalgo alumni
20th-century Mexican politicians
Municipal presidents in Michoacán
Members of the Congress of Michoacán
Deputies of the LXII Legislature of Mexico
Deputies of the LV Legislature of Mexico
Members of the Chamber of Deputies (Mexico) for Michoacán